Mary's Grove, also known as the Rabb House, is a historic home located at Lenoir, Caldwell County, North Carolina.  It was built between 1932 and 1934, and is a two-story, Colonial Revival-style stone house.  Also on the property are the contributing stone well-house, silo, and dairy.  The buildings were constructed by master stonemasons Leslie (1900-1957), Clarence (1903–1981), and Earl Lyons (1912-1984).

The house was listed on the National Register of Historic Places in 2001.

References

Houses on the National Register of Historic Places in North Carolina
Colonial Revival architecture in North Carolina
Houses completed in 1934
Houses in Caldwell County, North Carolina
National Register of Historic Places in Caldwell County, North Carolina
1934 establishments in North Carolina